Kipevu is a suburb of Mombasa, in Mombasa County, Kenya. It had a population of 44,720 in 1999.

Electorally, Kipevu is part of the Changamwe Constituency.

External links
Maplandia

Mombasa County
Populated places in Coast Province